Khodadad (also Romanized as Khodādād; also known as Kalāteh-ye Khodādād) is a village in Pol Khatun Rural District, Marzdaran District, Sarakhs County, Razavi Khorasan Province, Iran. At the 2006 census, its population was 158, in 31 families.

References 

Populated places in Sarakhs County